Paul Lewis Snyder, Sr. (born c. 1938) is a Buffalo, New York businessman and former owner of the Buffalo Braves basketball team.

Snyder was born and raised in Mansfield, Pennsylvania, and first attended Alfred University before transferring to the University at Buffalo. He was on the football and wrestling teams in college.

He founded the Freezer Queen frozen food company in Buffalo in 1958 and founded the Darien Lake theme park after purchasing  of land in Genesee County, New York, in 1964, owning the resort and slowly developing it into a major amusement park until he sold the resort in 1983. He also briefly operated a (now demolished) Industrial Park located on the southeastern grounds of the Buffalo Niagara International Airport in the late 1980s. Snyder owned the Buffalo Hyatt Regency in the 1990s and opened the renowned E.B. Green's Steakhouse within the hotel.

In 1971, Snyder purchased the Buffalo Braves, which was an expansion team in the 1970-1971 NBA season, from the original hedge fund managers who had secured the expansion franchise. He sold the team in 1977, unable to compete with the much more successful Buffalo Sabres, who also debuted in the National Hockey League in 1970, or with the local college basketball teams, who were largely hostile toward professional basketball in Buffalo and managed to prevent Snyder from securing home games at the Auditorium. The franchise later moved to San Diego (in a complicated swap with the Boston Celtics), then to Los Angeles, where it plays as the Los Angeles Clippers.

External links
Snyder Corporation website

References

Sports in Buffalo, New York
Buffalo Braves owners
Buffalo Bulls football players
Sportspeople from Buffalo, New York
Living people
1938 births